Marquis Louis-Antoine Caraccioli (6 November 1719 – 29 May 1803) was a prolific French writer, poet, historian, and biographer long considered an "enemy of Philosophy" because of his extensive writings as a religious apologist.

Life
Caraccioli was born in Paris to a noble family of Neapolitan origin, and held the title of Marquis. He studied in Mans and travelled in Italy, Germany and Poland and returned to Paris around 1768.

Caraccioli started his literary career during his travels in Italy. He wrote prolifically on a broad range of subjects. Caraccioli survived the French Revolution, despite his close ties to French aristocracy during the reigns of Louis XV and Louis XVI, but was left financially ruined. In 1795, he was awarded a 2000 franc pension by the National Convention. He died poor in Paris, in 1803, leaving, it is said, only eighty francs behind him.

His work was not ranked highly in his time; one of the old French biographical dictionaries, Nouvelle biographie générale, describes him as un littérateur (a maker of literature) rather than un écrivain (a writer).  He is especially interesting to eighteenth-century scholars of manners, Pope Clement XIV and ultramontanism, among other subjects. Caraccioli is best known among book collectors for his color-printed books – Le livre de quatre couleurs (1757) and Le livre à la mode (1759) – as well as La jouissance de soi-même (1759), Liège de Le véritable mentor (1759), Le langage de la raison (1763), De la gaieté (1767), L’agriculture simplifiée (1769), Le Voyage de la Raison en Europe (1772), and Lettres intéressantes du pape Clément XIV (1776), many of which went through numerous editions in Europe and the United States and have been translated into several languages.

Lettres intéressantes du pape Clément XIV, which are considered by many to be forgeries, initially misled many Europeans about the life of the then recently deceased Pope.

One of his most studied and collected books, Les adieux de la Maréchale de *** à ses enfants (1769) (trans. Advice from a Lady of Quality to her Children, in the Last Stage of a Lingering Illness, In a Series of Evening-Conferences on the Most Interesting Subjects) was written in a series of "conferences" or meetings, which substitute for chapters or the more common use of letters. Unlike most courtesy books, Caraccioli's has the semblance of a plot and reads somewhat like a novel, which ends with the death of the main character. Caraccioli's work evolved a great deal over the half-century in which it was produced, and gradually reflected many modern values. Today many of his books are collected by various libraries throughout Europe and America, especially the Bibliothèque nationale de France and the William Andrews Clark Memorial Library at UCLA.

Major works
 Caractère de l'amitié
 Conversation avec soi-même
 Jouissance de soi-même
 De la Grandeur d'âme
 Tableau de la mort
 De la gaieté
 Les adieux de la Maréchale de *** à ses enfants 
 Langage de la raison
 Langage de la religion
 Religion de l'honnête homme
 Le Chrétien du temps
 Diogène à Paris
 Le Livre à la mode
 Vraie manière d'élever les princes
 Dictionnaire pittoresque et sententieux
 Vie de Clément XIV
 Lettres intéressantes du pape Clément XIV
 Voyage de la raison en Europe

References

Further reading
Jacques, Martine. Louis-Antoine Caraccioli, Ecrivian et Voyageur. Lille : Atelier national de reproduction des thèses, 2001.

External links 
 
 Louis-Antoine Caraccioli peintre de l'Italie : une manifestation ignorée de l'ultramontanisme
 The Center & Clark Newsletter On Line, no. 40, Fall 2002

1719 births
1803 deaths
18th-century French writers
18th-century French male writers
French essayists
French biographers
French male essayists
18th-century essayists
Male biographers